Shichang is a training ship in the People's Republic of China's People's Liberation Army Navy (PLAN). The ship is formally designated as a "defence mobilization vessel" and may be used for helicopter or navigation training, as a container ship, or as a hospital ship. It is the PLAN's first aviation training ship. The NATO reporting name for the type is Daishi-class AXT.

Design
The original plan was to convert Shichang from the civilian roll-on/roll-off ship Huayuankou; a new ship was built instead.

Shichang has a bridge structure forward with the flight deck occupying most of the remaining area behind it; the funnel is toward the stern on the starboard side. The flight deck has two landing spots and may be reconfigured; options include a modular hangar and control space behind the forward structure, or 300 standard 20-foot containers.

See also
RFA Argus (A135), a Royal Navy auxiliary with a similar configuration

References

Sources

Auxiliary ships of the People's Liberation Army Navy
Training ships of the People's Liberation Army Navy
1997 ships
Auxiliary training ship classes
zh:世昌号国防动员舰